The UCAS Tariff (formerly called UCAS Points System) is used to allocate points to post-16 qualifications (Level 3 qualifications on the Regulated Qualifications Framework). Universities and colleges may use it when making offers to applicants. A points total is achieved by converting qualifications, such as A-Levels (Scottish Highers, BTECs, etc.), into points, making it simpler for course providers to compare applicants. It is used as a means of giving students from the United Kingdom places at UK universities.

While UCAS Tariff Points are often based on A-Levels, AS-Levels, Scottish Highers, etc., they can also be increased through other means, including taking extra-curricular activities, such as doing an EPQ or passing a Grade 6 in an instrument. Though this must remain cautionary as many universities will still have other entry requirements or expectations that they have for a student that may not be met with additional UCAS Points.

Common ways for UCAS points to be calculated are through the UCAS Tariff Calculator, official tariff tables, or through third-party software and websites.

The UCAS Tariff was first introduced in 2001. Since then, however, both the range of qualifications held by applicants, and the variety of progression routes into higher education have increased. Therefore a new Tariff was introduced. The new UCAS Tariff points are based on a different methodology. The change to new UCAS Tariff will not in itself change entry requirements for university or college courses. Universities and colleges are independent organisations and each year they decide how to set their entry requirements. Those universities and colleges that use UCAS Tariff points to express their entry requirements will simply set their requirements using the new number system.

Points system
The following qualifications can count towards the tariff:

GCE qualifications

New tariff

GCE A Levels 
These Tariff points have been used for applications submitted since the 2017 admissions cycle (i.e. for students making applications from September 2016 for full-time courses starting from September 2017). AVCE grades have the same points system, but AVCEs are no longer awarded.

GCE AS Levels
These Tariff points are used for applications submitted for the 2017 admissions cycle onwards (i.e. for students making applications from September 2016 for full-time courses starting from September 2017).

GCE A Level (Double Award)

GCE AS Level (Double Award)

GCE A Level with additional AS Level
These are only offered by AQA and Edexcel.

Original 2001 UCAS Points Tariff 
UCAS initially introduced a university points tariff which created a points system to cover the GCE A-Level and AS-Level qualification for students starting higher education in September 2001. (GCE A and AS Levels awarded before 2001 do not attract UCAS points).

Old tariff (2002-2016) 
UCAS revamped the original tariff to a single points system which included the majority of post-16 academic qualifications (including the allocation of points to Advanced GNVQS and Key Skills). This change applied to students starting courses in 2002. Additional post-16 qualifications were allocated points after this date.

International Baccalaureate

Higher Level subjects:

Standard Level subjects:

Theory of Knowledge and Extended Essay bonus points:

Full Diploma or each of its components.

BTECs
National Award
Ranging from 16 (Pass) to 48 (Distinction)
National Certificate
Ranging from 32 (Double Pass) to 96 (Double Distinction)
National Diploma
Ranging from 48 (Triple Pass) to 112 (Triple Distinction)
BTEC Nationals in Children’s Play, Learning and Development (NQF)
Ranging from 32 (Double Pass) to 112 (Double Distinction*)
BTEC National Certificate in Children’s Play, Learning and Development
Ranging from 48 (Triple Pass) to 168 (Triple Distinction*)
BTEC National Award in Children’s Play, Learning and Development
Ranging from 16 (Pass) to 56 (Distinction*)

T Levels

Extended Project Qualification (EPQ)

Scottish Qualifications Authority Qualifications

SQC Nationals Advanced Highers:

SQC Nationals Higher:

Advanced Placement exams

Irish Leaving Certificate
Higher Level:

Ordinary Level:

Music exams
These are only counted if at grade 6 or above.

Theory

Practical

Speech & Drama exams
These are only counted if at grade 1 or above.
Ranging from 8 points (Grade 1 Pass) to 30 (Grade 8 Distinction)
Individuals who complete the LAMDA Certificate in Performance Studies with merit or distinction can earn more points than are available for graded exams (8 for a pass, 16 for merit, 24 for distinction)

Others
The Welsh Baccalaureate is worth from 16 (Grade E) to 56 points (Grade A*). 
An Advanced Extension Award can either be worth 12 for a Merit or 14 for a Distinction (this is on top of the A level tariff)
Foundation Art and Design ranges from 80 for a pass to 112 for a Distinction.
Free-standing Mathematics Qualifications points range from 3 points for a grade E up to 10 points for a grade A.
ASDAN Certificate of Personal Effectiveness CoPE, offers 16 points.

See also
UCAS

References

External links
The UCAS Tariff calculator 2017
The UCAS Tariff tables 2017 (PDF)

Higher education in the United Kingdom
UCAS
University and college admissions
Education policy in the United Kingdom